is a passenger railway station located in the city of Ōtsu, Shiga Prefecture, Japan, operated by the private railway company Keihan Electric Railway. The Sakamoto Cable runs from Cable Sakamoto Station which is about 15 minutes walk from this station.

Lines

Station layout
The station consists of one bay platform serving two tracks.

Platforms

Adjacent stations

History
It was renamed to its present name on March 17, 2008.

Passenger statistics
In fiscal 2018, the station was used by an average of 1236 passengers daily (boarding passengers only).

Surrounding area
 Hiyoshi Taisha Shrine
 Hiyoshi Tosho-gu
 JR Hieizan Sakamoto Station
 Sakamoto Cable|Hieizan Railway]] Cable Sakamoto Station
 Enkeiji Gakuen Hieizan Junior High School / High School, Eizan Gakuin
 Otsu City Sakamoto Elementary School

See also
List of railway stations in Japan

References

External links

Keihan official home page

Railway stations in Shiga Prefecture
Stations of Keihan Electric Railway
Railway stations in Japan opened in 1927
Railway stations in Ōtsu